Kinala is a village in Uklana Tehsil in Hisar District of Haryana State, India

See also 
 Hisar
 Sarola
 Khudan
 Chhapar, Jhajjar
 Dhakla, Jhajjar

References 

Villages in Hisar district